The Ultimate Collection is the tenth album released by the O.C. Supertones. This was a two disc set.

Track listing

Disc One
 "Supertones Strike Back"
 "Unite"
 "Away from You"
 "O.C. Supertones"
 "Little Man"
 "Who Can Be Against Me"
 "Adonai"
 "Resolution"
 "Hold On to Jesus"
 "Grounded"
 "Wilderness"

Disc two
 "What It Comes To"
 "Unknown"
 "Hallelujah"
 "Louder Than the Mob"
 "Jury Duty"
 "Welcome Home"
 "Sure Shot"
 "Chase the Sun"
 "Go, Go, Go"
 "Grace Flood"

References 

2008 greatest hits albums
The O.C. Supertones albums
Tooth & Nail Records compilation albums